Kandaen is a 2011 Indian Tamil-language romantic comedy film written and directed by Mugil, and produced by TCS. It stars Shanthnoo Bhagyaraj and Rashmi Gautam in lead along with Santhanam, Vijayakumar and Ashish Vidyarthi in pivotal roles. The film, which was launched in May 2010, created curiosity after noted film-maker Gautham Vasudev Menon's newly launched audio label selected the film's soundtrack to be its first release. It was released on 20 May 2011 to average reviews from critics and was performed averagely at the box office, but Shanthnu's and Santhanam's comedy was appreciated. The film was dubbed and released in Telugu as Balapam Patti Bhama Odilo in 2016.

Plot
Vasanth is an engineer who comes from Chennai. One day, he goes to visit his grandfather who claims to be ill. When he arrives at his hometown, he finds that a marriage has been arranged for him and that his grandfather isn't really ill. To escape from the marriage, he lies, saying that he is in love with a girl. The grandfather wants to see the girl as soon as possible, and Vasanth returns to Chennai.

Vasanth falls in love with a pretty girl named Narmada at first sight. He acts blind and she eventually falls for him, too. They start dating and Narmadha's father, a police commissioner, gets  his daughter's love. He refuses, not wanting to marry his only daughter to a blind man. The pair decide that they will marry at the register office, without the consent of their parents. During the proceedings of the marriage, Narmada finds out that Vasanth isn't actually blind. She is angered and leaves the registrar's office, but later forgives him after he apologizes. Narmada's father finally agrees to their marriage, and the two get engaged. In the light of the engagement, Vasanth celebrates with his friends to a night in a bar. They get drunk, and Vasanth has a fight with a gang of thugs whom he had a fight earlier once when they misbehaved to Narmada. In the fight, he gets hit by an iron rod on the back of his head, damaging his optical nerves and losing his eyesight.

The doctor convinces him that there are laser treatments to get his eyesight back. She says that he has to undergo an operation but he has to wait until the head wound heals, and also that the surgeon will have to come from London. She tells him to rest and asks Vasanth's friend Saami to take care of him. Vasanth is then discharged from the hospital, but he tells the doctor not to tell anybody about his blindness before he leaves. Then one day, Narmada and her father suddenly come home with her father's friend Shankar. Narmadha's father says that he would not have accepted Vasanth had he been blind, and Vasanth and his friend realise that they cannot know that Vasanth is blind. Vasanth wants to tell Narmada that he is blind, but she gets angry when he mentions blindness. She tells him that she is glad he was only pretending to be blind, as living with a blind person would be extremely hard. Feeling down, Vasanth doesn't tell her about his accident.

One day, while crossing a road, Vasanth asks a girl for help. Narmada sees this and misunderstands that he is cheating on her as it looks like the similar to their first meeting, when Vasanth pretended to be blind. Narmadha's father learns of this. He gets Saami arrested and decides to marry Narmada off to another boy on the same marriage date, but she asks for a break and says that she wants to go to London to study. Saami comes out bail and finds this. Also, the ophthalmologist who's coming from London for Vasanth's operation had his flight cancelled. So Vasanth, along with his doctor in Chennai, boards the flight to London – on which Narmada is also travelling. Another coincidence occurs when the air hostess is the same girl who had helped Vasanth cross the road earlier. She tries to warn the air-hostess, saying that he deceives girls by pretending to be blind. The air hostess, on the other hand, manages to tell Narmada the truth and she learns of Vasanth's blindness. They reconcile, and as the movie comes to an end, Vasanth has a successful operation and they happily return to India to get married.

Cast
 Shanthnoo Bhagyaraj as Vasanth
 Rashmi Gautam as Narmada
 Santhanam as Saami
 Vijayakumar as Vasanth's grandfather
 Ashish Vidyarthi as Narmada's father
 Nellai Siva as Police officer
 Muthukaalai as Narmada's servant
 Nirmala Shrimal as Air Hostess
 Robert in a special appearance in the song  "Narmada"

Reception
The film received mixed reviews. Rashmi Gautam was praised for her acting and glam quotient. Behindwoods quoted that "she was the film's glam quotient and showed streaks of brilliance." Indiaglitz also praised her that "she is a welcome addition to the list of Tamil heroines and that she emoted well and interestingly after a long gap one got to see a heroine hogging major share in a movie." Rohit Ramachandran of nowrunning.com rated it 2.5/5 stating that "Kandaen is a romantic comedy without a heartbeat but enough pulse to crack you up."

Soundtrack

Film score and soundtrack of Kanden are composed by noted evangelical composer, Vijay Ebenezer, who made his debut into film music with the project. The audio rights of Kanden, were bought by Gautham Vasudev Menon after Singer Krish and Vijay had given a copy to Menon following the recommendation of actress Sangeetha and producer Sebastian. Menon impressed, wanted to release the audio under his newly launched label, Photon Kathaas Music. The music garnered positive reviews especially the song "Enge En Idhayam" became popular. Behindwoods quoted that the "It was a pretty decent effort composed by a newcomer. " Singer Krish made his debut as a lyricist with this film writing two songs.

The launch of Menon's banner and the film's album was held on 9 December 2010 at a ceremony featuring several chief guests including Suriya, K. Bhagyaraj and prominent composers Yuvan Shankar Raja and Harris Jayaraj. The following a day, a promotional event was held at Odyssey in Chennai, with live renditions from the album. The event featured performances from Chinmayi, Suchitra and Krish whilst Gautham Menon, Shanthnoo Bhagyaraj and Karthik Kumar were also in attendance.

References

External links
 Kanden at JointScene.com

2011 films
2010s Tamil-language films
Films about blind people in India
Indian romantic comedy films
2011 romantic comedy films
2011 directorial debut films